L'Aldosa de Canillo, known simply as L'Aldosa, is a village in Andorra, located in the parish of Canillo.  

Populated places in Andorra
Canillo